Keefers is a settlement in British Columbia.

Keefers Post Office was opened 1-8-1895 and closed 10-6-1965.

See also
Keefer (disambiguation)

References

Ghost towns

Settlements in British Columbia
Fraser Canyon
Populated places on the Fraser River